Nathan Wilson (born 7 January 1993) is a professional Australian rules footballer playing for the Fremantle Football Club in the Australian Football League (AFL). He previously played for the Greater Western Sydney Giants from 2012 to 2017.

AFL career

Wilson was recruited by Greater Western Sydney as an underage selection at the age of 17.
Wilson made his debut in round 1 of the 2012 AFL season during Greater Western Sydney's inaugural game against the Sydney Swans at ANZ Stadium kicking a goal on debut. At the end of the 2017 season, he was traded to the Fremantle Football Club.

Statistics
 Statistics are correct to the end of round 10, 2022

|- style="background-color: #EAEAEA"
! scope="row" style="text-align:center" | 2012
|
| 16 || 9 || 6 || 3 || 37 || 19 || 56 || 15 || 20 || 0.7 || 0.3 || 4.1 || 2.1 || 6.2 || 1.7 || 2.2
|-
! scope="row" style="text-align:center" | 2013
|
| 16 || 4 || 0 || 1 || 16 || 7 || 23 || 10 || 12 || 0.0 || 0.3 || 4.0 || 1.8 || 5.8 || 2.5 || 3.0
|- style="background-color: #EAEAEA"
! scope="row" style="text-align:center" | 2014
|
| 16 || 6 || 1 || 1 || 51 || 15 || 66 || 21 || 8 || 0.2 || 0.2 || 8.5 || 2.5 || 11.0 || 3.5 || 1.3
|-
! scope="row" style="text-align:center" | 2015
|
| 16 || 13 || 2 || 2 || 102 || 50 || 152 || 41 || 23 || 0.2 || 0.2 || 7.8 || 3.8 || 11.7 || 3.2 || 1.8
|- style="background-color: #EAEAEA"
! scope="row" style="text-align:center" | 2016
|
| 16 || 21 || 3 || 3 || 257 || 97 || 354 || 95 || 29 || 0.1 || 0.1 || 12.2 || 4.6 || 16.9 || 4.5 || 1.4
|-
! scope="row" style="text-align:center" | 2017
|
| 16 || 24 || 4 || 4 || 329 || 89 || 418 || 101 || 46 || 0.2 || 0.2 || 13.7 || 3.7 || 17.4 || 4.2 || 1.9
|- style="background-color: #EAEAEA"
! scope="row" style="text-align:center" | 2018
|
| 14 || 21 || 1 || 3 || 310 || 79 || 389 || 110 || 23 || 0.0 || 0.1 || 14.8 || 3.8 || 18.5 || 5.2 || 1.1
|-
! scope="row" style="text-align:center" | 2019
|
| 14 || 18 || 0 || 3 || 256 || 66 || 322 || 66 || 22 || 0.0 || 0.2 || 14.2 || 3.7 || 17.9 || 3.7 || 1.2
|- style="background-color: #EAEAEA"
! scope="row" style="text-align:center" | 2020
|
| 14 || 15 || 1 || 1 || 153 || 52 || 205 || 50 || 14 || 0.1 || 0.1 || 10.2 || 3.5 || 13.7 || 3.3 || 0.9
|-
! scope="row" style="text-align:center" | 2021
|
| 14 || 18 || 0 || 4 || 233 || 71 || 304 || 74 || 18 || 0.0 || 0.2 || 12.9 || 3.9 || 16.9 || 4.1 || 1.0
|- style="background-color: #EAEAEA"
! scope="row" style="text-align:center" | 2022
|
| 14 || 0 || – || – || – || – || – || – || – || – || – || – || – || – || – || –
|- class="sortbottom"
! colspan=3| Career
! 149
! 18
! 25
! 1744
! 545
! 2289
! 583
! 215
! 0.1
! 0.2
! 11.7
! 3.7
! 15.4
! 3.9
! 1.4
|}

Notes

References

External links

Living people
Australian rules footballers from Western Australia
Greater Western Sydney Giants players
1993 births
Indigenous Australian players of Australian rules football
Fremantle Football Club players
Peel Thunder Football Club players